Parectopa refulgens is a moth of the family Gracillariidae. It is known from Ecuador.

References

Gracillariinae